The Island Creek Subdivision is a railroad line owned by CSX Transportation in the U.S. state of West Virginia. At its east end the line continues west from the Logan Subdivision and at its west end the line comes to an end in the town Scarlet, West Virginia. Currently the last few miles of railbed are being removed by CSX..

See also
 List of CSX Transportation lines

References

CSX Transportation lines
Rail infrastructure in West Virginia
Chesapeake and Ohio Railway